Timur Karalbiyevich Shipshev (born 31 August 1970) is a Russian professional football manager and a former player. He is an assistant coach with Pari NN.

Manager career
He was appointed caretaker manager of PFC Spartak Nalchik on 15 April 2012 when Sergei Tashuyev resigned as a manager. Spartak Nalchik was relegated from the Russian Premier League under Shipshev's management two weeks later.

References

1970 births
People from Urvansky District
Sportspeople from Kabardino-Balkaria
Living people
Soviet footballers
Russian footballers
Association football defenders
PFC Spartak Nalchik players
Russian football managers
Russian Premier League managers
PFC Spartak Nalchik managers